(born 17 May 1970 in Taito, Tokyo) is  a Japanese actress. The fourth rehouse girl of Mitsui, she has starred in a number of TV drama series such as Daburu kitchin (1993) and Watashi no unmei (1994).

She is a graduate of Jumonji Junior College.

Filmography

Film
Time Leap (1997)
Kano (2014)
My Friend "A" (2018)
108: Revenge and Adventure of Goro Kaiba (2019), Mari Kaiba
Show Me the Way to the Station (2019)
The Flowers of Evil (2019)
Black School Rules (2019), Mari Machida
Fictitious Girl's Diary (2020)
461 Days of Bento: A Promise Between Father and Son (2020), Sakie Endō
The Brightest Roof in the Universe (2020)
Runway (2020)
Peaceful Death (2021)
Brothers in Brothel (2021)
Baragaki: Unbroken Samurai (2021), Satō Nobu
Every Trick in the Book (2021), Kanako
I Am What I Am (2022), Natsumi Sobata
Do Unto Others (2023)
Father of the Milky Way Railroad (2023), Ichi Miyazawa
Nigekireta Yume (2023)
The Water Flows to the Sea (2023)

Television
Daburu kitchin (1993) 
Watashi no unmei (1994)
Someday at a Place in the Sun (2013)
Kaiki Renai Sakusen (2015)
Haretsu (2015)
Hitoshi Ueki and Nobosemon (2017)
Kangoku no Ohimesama (2017), Yōko Daimon
Yuganda Hamon (2019)
Idaten (2019), Kimiko
Okaeri Mone (2021), Minami Oikawa
Bullets, Bones and Blocked Noses (2021), Yumeko Hōjō
A Day-Off of Ryunosuke Kamiki (2022)

Anime
Michiko & Hatchin (2008)

References

External links 
Official personal blog 

Japanese voice actresses
1970 births
People from Taitō
Living people
Stardust Promotion artists
21st-century Japanese singers
21st-century Japanese women singers